Bill Regan may refer to:

Bill Regan (baseball) (1899–1968), American professional baseball second baseman
Bill Regan (ice hockey) (1908–1995), Canadian professional ice hockey player
Bill Regan (footballer) (1873–1934), English professional football left winger